Eduardo Díez de Medina (8 February 1881 – 27 June 1955), was born in La Paz, Bolivia, and was Bolivia's Minister of Foreign Affairs and Worship on three occasions.  In 1941 Diez de Medina submitted himself to trial after he was accused of selling life-saving Bolivian visas to up to 15,000 Jews in Europe during World War II.

Political career
Medina was Bolivia's Minister of Foreign Affairs and Worship in 1923, 1925 and from 1936 to 1939. 

He signed on 9 July 1925 the Carillo-Diez de Medina treaty with Argentine representative Horacio Carillo, which settled a long border dispute between Argentina and Bolivia. He also negotiated with U.S. Secretary of State Frank B. Kellogg a plan to grant Bolivia the city of Arica, thereby granting it access to the sea. The plan, which was to result from an American mediation between Peru and Chile, failed due to a change in U.S. foreign policy following the election of President Herbert Hoover. Diez de Medina also enacted, together with Peruvian emissary M. Elias Bonemaison, the Treaty of 23 September 1902, which demarcated the border between Bolivia and Peru. In addition, he served as Latin American liaison to the League of Nations.

In 1941 Diez de Medina fell out of favor amidst a jingoistic political climate when he voluntarily submitted himself to trial after he was accused of selling life-saving Bolivian visas to up to 15,000 Jews in Berlin, Warsaw, Kaunas and Stockholm. Over 1,000 blank immigration permits were found for distribution in Warsaw, Hamburg, Genoa and Paris.

References
http://www.argentina-rree.com/7/7-069.htm
https://web.archive.org/web/20050411104310/http://www.rree.gov.bo/MINISTERIO/Ministros.htm
http://www.boliviaweb.com/mar/capitulo11.htm
https://web.archive.org/web/20051220085409/http://www.rree.gob.pe/portal/pexterior.nsf/0/71678f6d2373afad05256c5b0076c3bc?OpenDocument

Specific

 

1881 births
1955 deaths
People from La Paz
Foreign ministers of Bolivia
Bolivian diplomats